The Eswatini women's national football team represents Eswatini in international football for women.

Eswatini made their competitive debut in the qualification for the 1998 African Championships, where they lost to their neighbours, South Africa. Eswatini have not played in any further qualification matches, but they have played a number of friendly matches, mostly against neighbouring countries. In 2008, Eswatini beat Mozambique 3–1.

Team image

Nicknames
The Eswatini women's national football team has been known or nicknamed as the "Super Falcons".

Results and fixtures

The following is a list of match results in the last 12 months, as well as any future matches that have been scheduled.

Legend

2022

Coaching staff

Current coaching staff

As of 2020

Manager history

Christian Thwala (????–2022)
Simephi Mamba(2022-)

Players

Current squad
 The following players were named on 26 August 2022 for the 2022 COSAFA Women's Championship tournament.
 Caps and goals accurate up to and including 30 October 2021.

Recent call-ups
The following players have been called up to a Eswatini  squad in the past 12 months.

Previous squads
COSAFA Women's Championship
2020 COSAFA Women's Championship squad
2022 COSAFA Women's Championship squad

Records

 Active players in bold, statistics correct as of 18 April 2021.

Most capped players

Top goalscorers

Competitive record

FIFA Women's World Cup

*Draws include knockout matches decided on penalty kicks.

Olympic Games

Africa Women Cup of Nations

*Draws include knockout matches decided on penalty kicks.

African Games

COSAFA Women's Championship

*Draws include knockout matches decided on penalty kicks.

See also

Sport in Eswatini
Football in Eswatini
Women's football in Eswatini
Eswatini men's national football team

References

External links

 
African women's national association football teams